All Mirrors is the fourth studio album by American singer-songwriter Angel Olsen, released on October 4, 2019 by Jagjaguwar. Produced by Angel Olsen and John Congleton, the album was preceded by two singles, the title track and "Lark". Both releases were accompanied by music videos directed by Olsen's friend and longtime collaborator Ashley Connors. The album received widespread acclaim from music critics and debuted at No. 52 on the Billboard 200.

In August 2020 Olsen released Whole New Mess, an album featuring rearranged and rerecorded versions of select songs from All Mirrors.

Critical reception

 Stephen Deusner of Uncut praised the album, writing, "Even for an artist who has redefined herself with every record, All Mirrors is her boldest reinvention yet." Victoria Segal of Mojo gave the album a favorable review, writing, "Behind the parachute silk and dry ice, the smoke and mirrors, stands a record in high emotional definition, its outline becoming sharper by the second." Rachel Aroesti of Q wrote, "Novel and nostalgic, accessible and eccentric, All Mirrors strikes an impressive balance between the familiar and strange – resulting in an album that’s startling and breathtakingly beautiful."

In the review for AllMusic, Marcy Donelson commended Olsen by claiming that "Though she may have initially built her reputation on stark and brittle atmospheres, it turns out that her trademark vulnerability is only elevated by these stirring, highly stylized interpretations, making it a risk that pays off in spades."

Track listing

Personnel
Credits are adapted from the All Mirrors liner notes.

Musicians
 Angel Olsen – vocals , guitar , synthesizer , piano ; string arrangements 
 Joshua Jaeger – drums ; percussion 
 Ben Babbitt – electric bass guitar , electric guitar , synthesizer drones , Mellotron drones , synthesizers , bass synthesizer , baritone guitar , E-bow electric guitar , piano , Mellotron , 12-string acoustic guitar , vibraphone , upright bass , fuzz bass , additional string textures on violin and cello ; string arrangements 
 Jherek Bischoff – string conducting ; string arrangements 
 Paris Hurley – violin I 
 Laurann Angel – violin I 
 Crystal Brooke Alforque – violin I 
 Emily Call – violin II 
 Rachel Iba – violin II 
 Michelle Luna – violin II 
 Madeline Falcone – viola 
 Lauren Elizabeth Baba – viola 
 Marta Sofia Honer – viola 
 Aniela Marie Perry – cello 
 April Guthrie – cello 
 Nathaniel Walcott – trumpet , flugelhorn ; brass arrangement 
 Vikram Devasthali – trombone 

Production and artwork
 John Congleton – production; mixing
 Angel Olsen – production
 Sean Cook – assistant engineering
 Greg Calbi – mastering
 Ben Babbitt – pre-production
 Cameron McCool – album photography
 Angel Olsen – styling
 Jack Pitney – styling
 Elyse Lightner – styling
 Miles Johnson – art direction

Charts

References

External links
 

2019 albums
Angel Olsen albums
Jagjaguwar albums
Albums produced by John Congleton